Kosmos 482 ( meaning Cosmos 482), launched March 31, 1972, at 04:02:33 UTC, was an attempted Venus probe which failed to escape low Earth orbit. It is expected to crash back to Earth between 2023 and 2025. Its landing module, which weighs , is highly likely to reach the surface of Earth in one piece as it was designed to withstand 300 G's of acceleration and 100 atmospheres of pressure.

Beginning in 1962, the name Kosmos was given to Soviet spacecraft which remained in Earth orbit, regardless of whether that was their intended final destination. The designation of this mission as an intended planetary probe is based on evidence from Soviet and non-Soviet sources and historical documents. Typically Soviet planetary missions were initially put into an Earth parking orbit as a launch platform with a rocket engine and attached probe. The probes were then launched toward their targets with an engine burn with a duration of roughly four minutes. If the engine misfired or the burn was not completed, the probes would be left in Earth orbit and given a Kosmos designation.

Kosmos 482 was launched by a Molniya booster on March 31, 1972, four days after the Venera 8 atmospheric probe and may have been similar in design and mission plan. After achieving an Earth parking orbit, the spacecraft made an apparent attempt to launch into a Venus transfer trajectory. It separated into four pieces, two of which remained in low Earth orbit and decayed within 48 hours into south New Zealand and two pieces (presumably the payload and detached engine unit) went into a higher  orbit. An incorrectly set timer caused the Blok L stage to cut off prematurely, preventing the probe from escaping Earth orbit.

At 1:00 AM on April 3, 1972, four red-hot  titanium alloy balls landed within a  radius of each other just outside Ashburton, New Zealand. 
The  spheres scorched holes in crops and made deep indentations in the soil, but no one was injured. A similarly shaped object was discovered near Eiffelton, New Zealand, in 1978.

Space law required that the space junk be returned to its national owner, but the Soviets denied knowledge or ownership of the satellite. Ownership therefore fell to the farmer upon whose property the satellite fell. The pieces were thoroughly analyzed by New Zealand scientists which determined that they were Soviet in origin because of manufacturing marks and the high-tech welding of the titanium. The scientists concluded that they were probably gas pressure vessels of a kind used in the launching rocket for a satellite or space vehicle and had decayed in the atmosphere.

See also 

 Kosmos (satellite)
 List of missions to Venus
 Russian space program

References

External links
 Space.com: Aussies, Kiwis Take Mir Deorbit in Stride 02:11 pm ET February 20, 2001
 Wired Magazine: Awaiting Mir's Crash Down Under 02:00 AM Feb, 19, 2001

1972 in spaceflight
1972 in the Soviet Union
Satellites formerly orbiting Earth
Ashburton, New Zealand
Kosmos 0482
Space accidents and incidents in the Soviet Union
Venera program
Spacecraft launched in 1972